State Route 26 (SR 26) is a primary state highway in the U.S. state of Virginia.  Known as Oakville Road, the state highway runs  from U.S. Route 460 (US 460), SR 24, and US 460 Business in Appomattox north to US 60 in Bent Creek.

Route description

SR 26 begins as a four-lane divided highway at a diamond interchange with US 460 and SR 24 (Richmond Highway) just north of the town of Appomattox.  The roadway continues south of the expressway bypass of the town as US 460 Business (Confederate Boulevard), which leads to the Appomattox Historic District.  SR 26 reduces to a two-lane undivided road and heads north as Oakville Road through northwestern Appomattox County.  The state highway passes through the hamlet of Oakville.  Near the northern end of SR 26, the highway descends into the narrow valley of Bent Creek.  The state highway crosses the stream just south of the stream's mouth at the James River.  A short distance to the north, SR 26 reaches its terminus at US 60 (James Anderson Highway) in the hamlet of Bent Creek just south of the U.S. Highway's crossing of the James River.

Major intersections

History
The route originally continued south of Appomattox through to Charlotte and Halifax Counties, passing by what is now VA 40 in Phenix and ending at what is now VA 92 in the former town of Clover. The Appomattox-Phenix portion is now SR 727, while the Phenix-Clover portion is now SR 746.

References

External links

Virginia Highways Project: VA 26

026
State Route 026